Arden is an unincorporated community located in southern Buncombe County, North Carolina, United States.  Arden is considered to be approximately  the area between Skyland and Fletcher near the Henderson County line.  Arden's ZIP code is 28704. Its post office serves Royal Pines and Avery Creek census designated places to the east and the area to the west of the post office. Arden is part of the Asheville Metropolitan Statistical Area.

The town was named for the Forest of Arden noted in the comedy, As You Like It, by Shakespeare.

Arden is home to Glen Arden Elementary school, located at 50 Pinehurst Circle, Arden, 28704. Arden is also home to Christ School, a private Episcopal school for boys.

Historic structures  
The Blake House was listed on the National Register of Historic Places in 2010. The structure is a rare example of the Gothic Revival Style in the state.

Arden is home to the Oak Park Historic District that was established in 1927. While building was interrupted due to the crash of 1929, more than 15 homes of the period remain standing today.

References 

for information in infobox

External links 
Glen Arden Elementary School
Christ School
Google Map of Arden
Hometown Locator - Arden

Unincorporated communities in Buncombe County, North Carolina
Asheville metropolitan area
Unincorporated communities in North Carolina